The Bloodsugars are a Brooklyn-based rock band, composed of Jason Rabinowitz, Brendan O'Grady, Matt Katz, and Kenneth Salters. Rabinowitz is the primary singer and songwriter in the band. David Beauchamp was the original drummer, but he left to focus on playing with Jeffrey Lewis, and Kenneth Salters took his place.

Biography
The Bloodsugars are signed to Engine Room Recordings, a Manhattan-based indie label. Engine Room released their debut EP, BQEP, in 2008. Their debut album is titled I Can't Go On, I'll Go On.

The Bloodsugars recorded two songs for Guilt by Association Vol. 2, a compilation released by Engine Room Recordings featuring independent artists covering well-known pop and R&B songs from the 1980s, 1990s, and 2000s. They covered Laura Branigan's 1984 hit song "Self Control", as well as Chris de Burgh's 1986 hit song, "The Lady in Red" (released as an iTunes Store bonus track).

Current members
 Jason Rabinowitz – Vocals, Guitar
 Brendan O'Grady – Bass
 Matt Katz – Synths
 Kenneth Salters – Drums

Discography

Albums
I Can't Go On, I'll Go On (Engine Room Recordings, 2009)
Light at the End of the Tunnel
The Pedestrian Boogie
Form/Function
Sleep Well (Cottage Industry)
Falling Makes You Blue
Happiness
Girls At
I Want It Back
Fly Along
Before the Accident

EPs
 BQEP (Engine Room Recordings, 2008)
Purpose Was Again - 4:19
Bloody Mary - 4:15
Cinderella - 3:05
Breakfast on the BQE -  4:55
Saint of Containment - 4:36
Uh Oh - 4:09

Compilations
 Guilt by Association Vol. 2 (Engine Room Recordings, 2008) Songs: "Self Control" (Laura Branigan cover) and "The Lady in Red" (Chris de Burgh cover)

References

External links
Official website
The Bloodsugars on Myspace
The Bloodsugars interviewed on Hey Brooklyn

Indie rock musical groups from New York (state)
Musical groups from Brooklyn